Frederick "Freddie" Minshull Stockdale (20 May 1947 – 23 November 2018) was a British opera impresario known for founding Pavilion Opera. He also wrote a number of fiction and non-fiction works with an opera theme.

Early life and family

Stockdale was born in 1947, the younger son of Sir Edmund Villiers Minshull Stockdale, Lord Mayor of London from 1959 to 1960. He was educated at Eton College and Jesus College, Cambridge, where he obtained a degree in law.

His first marriage was dissolved and his second was to Adele Mason who sings lead soprano in opera.

Career
Despite his law degree, Stockdale never practised, being better known as an impresario and author. He built an opera pavilion in the garden of his house in Lincolnshire, Thorpe Tilney Hall, and in 1981 launched the touring company Pavilion Opera. The company closed in July 2018. After Lincolnshire, Stockdale moved to East Sussex where his plans for the renovation of Eastwood Farm proved so controversial they were referred to central government for approval before they could proceed.

His writing career included fiction and non-fiction works with an opera theme.

Politically, Stockdale was a supporter of the Labour renegade Dick Taverne, and became associated with his Democratic Labour Association in the aftermath of the Lincoln by-election in 1973. He was elected as an Independent on to Lincolnshire County Council in 1977, representing East Kesteven no. 2 ward, and in the 1979 general election stood as the Democratic Labour candidate in Lincoln, where he came fourth with 4.1 per cent of the vote – enough to prevent the re-election of the sitting Labour MP, Margaret Jackson, who had herself defeated Taverne in the October 1974 general election. Stockdale joined the Social Democratic Party (SDP) on its foundation in 1981, and stood again in Lincoln as its candidate in the general election two years later, achieving 25 per cent of the vote and third place.

Death
Stockdale died in 2018.

Selected publications
 The Opera Guide. Collins & Brown, London, 1990. (With M.R. Dreyer)  
 Figaro Here, Figaro There: Pavilion Opera: An Impresarioʾs Diary. John Murray, 1991. 
 The Bridgwater Sale. Doubleday, London, 1993. 
 Criminal Conversations. Doubleday, London, 1994. 
 Affairs of State. Doubleday, London, 1995. 
 Emperors of Song: Three Great Impresarios. John Murray, London, 1998.

References

External links

1947 births
2018 deaths
Alumni of Jesus College, Cambridge
Impresarios
Members of Lincolnshire County Council
People educated at Eton College
British non-fiction writers
Writers about music